Curtis Taylor may refer to:
 Curtis Taylor (American football)
 Curtis Taylor (Australian footballer)
Curtis Taylor (baseball)